In Greek mythology, Proteus is an early prophetic sea god or god of rivers and oceanic bodies of water, one of several deities whom Homer calls the "Old Man of the Sea" (hálios gérôn). Some who ascribe a specific domain to Proteus call him the god of "elusive sea change", which suggests the constantly changing nature of the sea or the liquid quality of water. He can foretell the future, but, in a mytheme familiar to several cultures, will change his shape to avoid doing so; he answers only to those who are capable of capturing him. From this feature of Proteus comes the adjective protean, meaning "versatile", "mutable", or "capable of assuming many forms". "Protean" has positive connotations of flexibility, versatility and adaptability.

Name origin
It is not certain to what this refers, but in myths where he is the son of Poseidon, it possibly refers to his being Poseidon's eldest son, older than Poseidon's other son, the sea-god Triton.

Family 
Proteus was generally regarded as the son of the sea-god Poseidon and Phoenice, a daughter of King Phoenix of Phoenicia.

The children of Proteus by Torone (Chrysone) of Phlegra were Polygonus (Tmolus) and Telegonus. They both challenged Heracles at the behest of Hera and were killed by the hero. Another son of Proteus, Eioneus, became the father of Dymas, king of Phrygia. By the Nereid Psamathe, Proteus fathered Theoclymenos and Theonoe (Eidothea or Eurynome). Cabeiro, mother of the Cabeiri and the three Cabeirian nymphs by Hephaestus, was also called the daughter of Proteus. Other daughters were Rhoiteia who gave her name to the city of Rhoiteion in Troad, Thebe who became the eponym of Thebes in Egypt and Thaicrucia who mothered Nympheus by Zeus.

Mythology

Proteus, prophetic sea-god 
According to Homer (Odyssey iv: 355), the sandy island of Pharos situated off the coast of the Nile Delta was the home of Proteus, the oracular Old Man of the Sea and herdsman of the sea-beasts. In the Odyssey, Menelaus relates to Telemachus that he had been becalmed here on his journey home from the Trojan War. He learned from Proteus' daughter Eidothea ("the very image of the Goddess"), that if he could capture her father, he could force him to reveal which of the gods he had offended and how he could propitiate them and return home. Proteus emerged from the sea to sleep among his colony of seals, but Menelaus was successful in holding him, though Proteus took the forms of a lion, a serpent, a leopard, a pig, even of water or a tree. Proteus then answered truthfully, further informing Menelaus that his brother Agamemnon had been murdered on his return home, that Ajax the Lesser had been shipwrecked and killed, and that Odysseus was stranded on Calypso's Isle Ogygia.

According to Virgil in the fourth Georgic, at one time the bees of Aristaeus, son of Apollo, all died of a disease. Aristaeus went to his mother, Cyrene, for help; she told him that Proteus could tell him how to prevent another such disaster, but would do so only if compelled. Aristaeus had to seize Proteus and hold him, no matter what he would change into. Aristaeus did so, and Proteus eventually gave up and told him that the bees' death was a punishment for causing the death of Eurydice. To make amends, Aristaeus needed to sacrifice 12 animals to the gods, leave the carcasses in the place of sacrifice, and return three days later. He followed these instructions, and upon returning, he found in one of the carcasses a swarm of bees which he took to his apiary. The bees were never again troubled by disease.

There are also legends concerning Apollonius of Tyana that say Proteus incarnated himself as the 1st century philosopher. These legends are mentioned in the 3rd century biographical work Life of Apollonius of Tyana.

Proteus, king of Egypt

In the Odyssey (iv.430ff)  Menelaus wrestles with "Proteus of Egypt, the immortal old man of the sea who never lies, who sounds the deep in all its depths, Poseidon's servant" (Robert Fagles's translation).  Proteus of Egypt is mentioned in an alternative version of the story of Helen of Troy in the tragedy Helen of Euripides (produced in 412 BC). The often unconventional playwright introduces a "real" Helen and a "phantom" Helen (who caused the Trojan War), and gives a backstory that makes the father of his character Theoclymenus, Proteus, a king in Egypt who had been wed to a Nereid Psamathe. In keeping with one of his themes in Helen, Euripides mentions in passing Eido ("image"), a daughter of the king and therefore sister of Theoclymenus who underwent a name-change after her adolescence and became "Theonoë," "god-minded," since she was as it turned out capable of foreseeing the future—as such, she is a prophet who appears as a crucial character in the play. The play's king Proteus is already dead at the start of the action, and his tomb is present onstage. It appears that he is only marginally related to the "Old Man of the Sea" and should not be confused with the sea god Proteus, although it is tempting to see Euripides as playing a complex literary game with the sea god's history—both Proteuses, for example, are protectors of the house of Menelaus, both are connected with the sea, both dwell in Egypt, and both are "grandfatherly" or "ancient" figures.

At Pharos a king of Egypt named Proteus welcomed the young god Dionysus in his wanderings. In Hellenistic times, Pharos was the site of the Lighthouse of Alexandria, one of the seven wonders of the ancient world.

Cultural references

In alchemy and psychology
The German mystical alchemist Heinrich Khunrath wrote of the shape-changing sea-god who, because of his relationship to the sea, is both a symbol of the unconscious as well as the perfection of the art. Alluding to the scintilla, the spark from ‘the light of nature’ and symbol of the anima mundi, Khunrath in Gnostic vein stated of the Protean element Mercury:

In modern times, the Swiss psychologist Carl Jung defined the mythological figure of Proteus as a personification of the unconscious, who, because of his gift of prophecy and shape-changing, has much in common with the central but elusive figure of alchemy, Mercurius.

In literature
The poet John Milton, aware of the association of Proteus with the Hermetic art of alchemy, wrote in Paradise Lost of alchemists who sought the philosopher's stone:

In his 1658 discourse The Garden of Cyrus, Sir Thomas Browne, pursuing the figure of the quincunx, queried:
"Why Proteus in Homer the Symbole of the first matter, before he settled himself in the midst of his Sea-Monsters, doth place them out by fives?"

Shakespeare uses the image of Proteus to establish the character of his great royal villain Richard III in the play Henry VI, Part Three, in which the future usurper boasts:

Shakespeare also names one of the main characters of his play The Two Gentlemen of Verona Proteus. Inconsistent with his affections, his deceptions have unraveled at the finale of the play as he is brought face-to-face with his friend Valentine and original love Julia:

In 1807, William Wordsworth finished his sonnet on the theme of a modernity deadened to Nature, which opens "The world is too much with us", with a sense of nostalgia for the lost richness of a world numinous with deities: 

James Joyce's Ulysses uses Protean transformations of matter in time for self-exploration. "Proteus" is the title provided for the third chapter in the Linati schema for Ulysses.

The protagonist of Kurt Vonnegut's 1952 novel Player Piano is an engineer named Paul Proteus.

Proteus is the name of the submarine in the original story by Otto Klement and Jay Lewis Bixby, which became the basis for the 1966 film Fantastic Voyage and Isaac Asimov's novelization.

John Barth's novelette "Menelaiad" in Lost in the Funhouse is built around a battle between Proteus and Menelaus. It is told as a multiply-nested frame tale, and the narrators bleed into each other as the battle undermines their identities.

"Proteus: The City" is the title of Book Four of Thomas Wolfe's autobiographical novel Of Time and the River.

In cinema
The Lighthouse, directed by Robert Eggers, depicts the event of two lighthouse keepers stranded on an island while progressively going mad. One of the characters is modeled on Proteus, a "prophecy-telling ocean god who serves Poseidon", and is even shown with tentacles and sea creatures stuck to his body.

Biology 
The protist Amoeba proteus is named for the Greek god, as it has no fixed shape and constantly changes form.

Other usage 
In medicine, Proteus syndrome refers to a rare genetic condition characterized by symmetric overgrowth of the bones, skin, and other tissues. Organs and tissues affected by the disease grow out of proportion to the rest of the body. This condition is associated with mutations of the PTEN gene. Proteus also refers to a genus of Gram-negative Proteobacteria, some of which are opportunistic human pathogens known to cause urinary tract infections, most notably. Proteus mirabilis is one of these and is most referenced in its tendency to produce "stag-horn" calculi composed of struvite (magnesium ammonium phosphate) that fill the human renal pelvis.

In July 2019 the British professional wrestling company PROGRESS Wrestling announced the introduction of a Proteus Championship. The current holder of the championship will be allowed to declare the type of match they will defend the championship in, with each new champion being able to set their own match type. The name of the championship was chosen due to its ever-changing nature, reflecting the shape-changing abilities of the deity it was named for.

Honours
Proteus Lake in Antarctica is named after the deity.

Gallery

See also
 Proteus in popular culture
 USS Proteus
 HMS Proteus
 Oresteia, section Proteus

Notes

References
 Apollodorus, The Library with an English Translation by Sir James George Frazer, F.B.A., F.R.S. in 2 Volumes, Cambridge, MA, Harvard University Press; London, William Heinemann Ltd. 1921. ISBN 0-674-99135-4. Online version at the Perseus Digital Library. Greek text available from the same website.
 Euripides, The Complete Greek Drama, edited by Whitney J. Oates and Eugene O'Neill, Jr. in two volumes. 2. Helen, translated by Robert Potter. New York. Random House. 1938. Online version at the Perseus Digital Library.
 Euripides, Euripidis Fabulae. vol. 3. Gilbert Murray. Oxford. Clarendon Press, Oxford. 1913. Greek text available at the Perseus Digital Library.
 Graves, Robert, The Greek Myths, Harmondsworth, London, England, Penguin Books, 1960. 
 Graves, Robert, The Greek Myths: The Complete and Definitive Edition. Penguin Books Limited. 2017. 
 Homer, The Odyssey with an English Translation by A.T. Murray, PH.D. in two volumes. Cambridge, MA., Harvard University Press; London, William Heinemann, Ltd. 1919. . Online version at the Perseus Digital Library. Greek text available from the same website.
 Kerényi, Carl, The Gods of the Greeks, Thames and Hudson, London, 1951.
 Lycophron, The Alexandra  translated by Alexander William Mair. Loeb Classical Library Volume 129. London: William Heinemann, 1921. Online version at the Topos Text Project.
 Lycophron, Alexandra translated by A.W. Mair. London: William Heinemann; New York: G.P. Putnam's Sons. 1921. Greek text available at the Perseus Digital Library.
 E. Prioux, «Géographie symbolique des errances de Protée: un mythe et sa relecture politique à l’époque impériale», in A. Rolet (dir.), Protée en trompe-l'œil. Genèse et survivances d'un mythe, d'Homère à Bouchardon (Paris, P.U.R., 2009), p. 139-164 (Interférences).
 Pseudo-Clement, Recognitions from Ante-Nicene Library Volume 8, translated by Smith, Rev. Thomas. T. & T. Clark, Edinburgh. 1867. Online version at theio.com
 A. Scuderi, Il paradosso di Proteo. Storia di una rappresentazione culturale da Omero al postumano, Carocci, Collana Lingue e letterature n.147, Roma, 2012. 
 
 Stephanus of Byzantium, Stephani Byzantii Ethnicorum quae supersunt, edited by August Meineike (1790-1870), published 1849. A few entries from this important ancient handbook of place names have been translated by Brady Kiesling. Online version at the Topos Text Project.
 Strabo, The Geography of Strabo. Edition by H.L. Jones. Cambridge, Mass.: Harvard University Press; London: William Heinemann, Ltd. 1924. Online version at the Perseus Digital Library.
 Strabo, Geographica edited by A. Meineke. Leipzig: Teubner. 1877. Greek text available at the Perseus Digital Library.
 Tzetzes, John, Book of Histories, Book II-IV translated by Gary Berkowitz from the original Greek of T. Kiessling's edition of 1826. Online version at theio.com

External links

 
 

Greek sea gods
Deities in the Iliad
Children of Poseidon
Shapeshifters in Greek mythology